This list of Quaid-i-Azam University people includes notable alumni, professors, and administrators associated with the Quaid-i-Azam University.

Alumni 
 Abdul Rashid Ghazi
 Abrar ul Haq
 Hamza Ali Abbasi
 Mian Muhammad Aslam Iqbal
 Gulshan Kumar Maheshwari
 Alamgir Hashmi
 Ansar Pervaiz
 Arshad Sharif
 Fayyazuddin
 Irshad Hussain
 Hareem Farooq
 Ilhan Niaz
 Khadija Mushtaq
 Maliha Lodhi
 Marriyum Aurangzeb
 Mazhar Mahmood Qurashi
 Muhammad Sharif
 Muhammad Suhail Zubairy
 Muhammad Imran Qadir
 Nasim Zehra
 Nargis Sethi
 Nisar Ali Khan
 Pervaiz Iqbal Cheema
 Pervez Hoodbhoy
 Qaiser Mushtaq
 Qamar-uz-Zaman Chaudhry
 Rana Mubashir
 Zafarullah Khan
 Shamshad Akhtar
 Shireen Mazari
 Tahir Amin
 Tasneem M. Shah
 Brigadier Anis Ahmed

Faculty 
 Aasim Sajjad Akhtar
 Ahmed Hassan Dani
 Akbar S. Ahmed 
 Asghar Qadir
 Fayyazuddin
 Ismat Beg
 Ilhan Niaz
 Maliha Lodhi
 Raziuddin Siddiqui
 Zia Mian

Photo gallery

External links

References 

Alumni
Academic staff of Quaid-i-Azam University
Quaid-i-Azam University alumni